The Roskilde Museum of Tools is a branch of Roskilde Museum located on Ringstedgade in Roskilde, Denmark. It contains a collection of tools used by craftsmen such as wheelwrights, carpenters, shoemakers and wood carvers from around 1850 to 1950. Visitors to the museum, housed on the first floor of a former granary known as Lützhøfts Købmandsgård, can also visit the operational private workshops of a wood carver, a silversmith and a weaver. The museum was opened in 1977.

References

Roskilde
Local museums in Metropolitan Copenhagen
Listed buildings and structures in Roskilde Municipality
Museums in Region Zealand
Museums established in 1977